The anime television series Gate was produced by A-1 Pictures and directed by Takahiko Kyōgoku. The series' character designs are based on the light novel illustrations. The first 12 episodes aired in Japan between July 4 and September 18, 2015. The second half aired on Tokyo MX from January 9 to March 26, 2016. It was streamed online by Crunchyroll and is licensed by Sentai Filmworks in North America. Sentai Filmworks released a complete collection of the series on Blu-ray and DVD on July 11, 2017.


Episode list

References

Gate